Sahiwal Medical College, Sahiwal (Urdu:, SLMC, established in 2010, is a public school of medicine located in Sahiwal, Punjab, Pakistan. It was established to provide education in the Punjab region and especially in Sahiwal District. Old District Headquarter Teaching Hospital Sahiwal (558 beds) renamed now Sahiwal Teaching Hospital Sahiwal (with addition of double bed capacity), Government Haji Abdul Qayyum Teaching Hospital Sahiwal (72 beds) and Ghalla Mandi Mini Hospital (10 beds) Sahiwal are attached to the college as the teaching hospitals. The student intake is 120 students per year. The new block of DHQ hospital is under construction. After it is functional, the DHQ Teaching Hospital Sahiwal is going to be transformed into 1158 beds hospital
Construction of new hospital within the new campus will soon start  The college is also administering Nursing Teaching Institute at Sahiwal Teaching Hospital.

Sahiwal Medical College graduates are known as Sahilites throughout the globe. According to legacy, each batch has its own name as following.
Batch S1 2010-15 Jaguars 
Batch S2 2011-16 Falcons 
Batch S3 2012-17 Blazoners
Batch S4 2013-18 Fighters
Batch S5 2014-19 Titans 
Batch S6 2015-20 Scorchers
Batch S7 2016-21 Vikings 
Batch S8 2017-22 Spartans 
Batch S9 2018-23 Sterlings 
Batch S10 2019-24 Pirates
Batch S11 2020-25 Griffins

Inauguration
Sahiwal is a district and division of Punjab, having a rich agriculture-based economy. Feeling the utmost need of a medical college in the area, on 27 November 2010, Chief Minister Punjab laid the foundation stone of Sahiwal Medical College. The government has allotted 70 acres near Central Jail Sahiwal for the college, where the campus was completed at the cost of Rs. 1 billion in 2014 and the college shifted to its new building.

Academic programs
 Bachelor of Medicine and Bachelor of Surgery (MBBS) – a five-year undergraduate programme

Departments

Basic science departments
Anatomy
Biochemistry
Community medicine
Forensic medicine
Pathology
Pharmacology
Physiology

Medicine and allied departments
Cardiology
Dermatology
Endocrinology & Metabolism
General medicine
Neurology
Pediatrics
Preventive medicine
Psychiatry
Pulmonology (Chest medicine)
Radiotherapy
Urology

Surgery and allied departments
Anesthesiology
Cardiac surgery
Cosmetic surgery
General surgery
Neurosurgery
Obstetrics and gynaecology
Ophthalmology
Oral and maxillofacial surgery
Orthopedics
Otorhinolaryngology
Pediatric surgery
Radiology

Administrative departments
IT Department

Recognition
The medical college is listed in the International Medical College Education Directory (IMED).

See also
 Societies of Sahiwal Medical College 
 Literary Society 
 Debating Society 
 Sports and Gaming Society
 Media and Arts Society
 Dramatic Society 
 Islamic Society 
 Welfare Society 
 Photographic Club
 SYNCH SLMC

The college campus has a cricket ground, football ground, volleyball ground, basketball court. Table tennis, badminton and athletics are also part of the extracurricular activities of SLMC.

Sports week is held in February in which almost every game is played within and inter classes. After sports week there is a student's week in which competitions of Qirat, Naat, Millisong, debating, drama, short video and cultural performances take place between classes.
A recent addition to the college's extracurricular activities is the Sport's league and RAMZAN PREMIER LEAGUE which are non-official competitions of cricket, volleyball and football.
In the month of April, the annual funfair is organized for pure entertainment purposes.

References

External links

Medical colleges in Punjab, Pakistan
Academic institutions in Pakistan
Educational institutions established in 2010
2010 establishments in Pakistan